Ann McGovern Scheiner (née Weinberger; May 25, 1930 – August 8, 2015) was an American writer of more than 55 children's books, selling over 30 million copies. She may be best known for her adaptation of Stone Soup, as well as Too Much Noise, historical and travel non-fiction, and biographies of figures like Harriet Tubman and Deborah Sampson and Eugenie Clark.

Early life

Born in New York, New York, she enrolled in the University of New Mexico but dropped out to marry her English professor. The marriage ended and she moved back, at age 22, to New York City with her 18-month old son. In attempting to support herself and become a writer, she found a job at the publisher of Little Golden Books stamping galley prints. She published several books at Golden Books.

Career

Artists for her books include Ezra Jack Keats, Simms Taback, Tomie de Paola and Mort Gerberg. She eventually moved into the Edna St. Vincent Millay house at 75½ Bedford Street, the narrowest house in New York, which inspired Mr Skinner's Skinny House. She married Martin Scheiner in 1970, the inventor of the first cardiac monitor for operating rooms, and adopted his three grown children. They lived together in the Usonia Historic District community in Westchester, New York.

She published four books of poetry in the 2000s, and began blogging about her cancer in 2014.

Death
McGovern died of cancer in New York City on August 8, 2015, aged 85.

Selected works

 Mr Skinner's Skinny House
 Aesop's Fables
 Little Whale
 Runaway Slave: The Story of Harriet Tubman
 Black is Beautiful
 Stone Soup
 Too Much Noise - 1957
 Eggs on Your Nose
 Robin Hood of Sherwood Forest
 Christopher Columbus
 The Desert Beneath the Sea
 Shark Lady: True Adventures of Eugenie Clark
 The Secret Soldier: The Story of Deborah Sampson - 1975
 Night Dive - 1984
 If You Sailed on the Mayflower in 1620  - 1969 
 The Pilgrims' First Thanksgiving - 1973
 Nicholas Bentley Stoningpot III - 1982

References

External links

 Good Reads
 Scholastic

1930 births
2015 deaths
American children's writers
Deaths from cancer in New York (state)
Writers from New York City
American women poets
American science writers
American women non-fiction writers
American women children's writers
20th-century American novelists
20th-century American women writers
20th-century American non-fiction writers
21st-century American poets
21st-century American novelists
21st-century American non-fiction writers
21st-century American women writers